Canovasee (Romansh: Lag or Leg da Canova) is a lake in Paspels, Grisons, Switzerland.

In 2004, the "First Love, Last Rites" (by Susanne Kaelin and released 2006) was filmed at the lake.

External links
Water temperature

Lakes of Switzerland
Lakes of Graubünden
Domleschg